Boulder Electric Vehicle was a manufacturer of electric-powered commercial vans and trucks based in Lafayette, Colorado. The company produced four CARB-certified models: an electric delivery van, a 15-passenger shuttle, a service body and a flat bed. Boulder Electric Vehicles ended production in September 2014.

Vehicles
Boulder Electric Vehicles produced four vehicles and all models shared the same specs and functionality. All vehicles used lithium iron phosphate (LiFePO4) battery packs.

Customers in the U.S. included Precision Plumbing, Heating & Cooling, which bought the first DV-500 in January 2012, FedEx, and the cities of San Antonio and Dallas, both as pilot programs, and the latter financed with a U.S. Department of Energy grant.

See also
Battery electric vehicle
Government incentives for plug-in electric vehicles
List of modern production plug-in electric vehicles
Plug-in electric vehicle

References

External links

Official website

Battery electric vehicle manufacturers
Electric vehicle manufacturers of the United States
Companies based in Colorado
Lafayette, Colorado